The 9th Macau International Movie Festival were held in Macau by the Macau Film and Television Media Association in December 2017.

Winners and nominees

References

External links

Golden Lotus Awards
Macau
2017 in Macau
Gold